Freddy de Jesús (born October 30, 1954) is a Puerto Rican former professional tennis player.

Born in San Juan, de Jesús was a Junior Orange Bowl winner in 1966, then in 1968 won the 14s Easter Bowl title for the tournament's inaugural year. While competing in the 16s age group he won U.S. national championships on both clay and hardcourt.

De Jesús played collegiate tennis for the University of Michigan, earning All-American honors in 1974 and 1975.

At the 1975 Pan American Games in Mexico City, de Jesús won two medals for Puerto Rico. He beat Chile's Álvaro Fillol in the bronze medal play-off and partnering Maria Annexy was runner-up in the mixed doubles, to Lele Forood and Hank Pfister.

His best performance on the Grand Prix tennis circuit was a quarter-final appearance at the San Juan Open in 1981.

De Jesús was a 1991 inductee into the Puerto Rico Sports Hall of Fame.

References

External links
 
 

1954 births
Living people
Puerto Rican male tennis players
Sportspeople from San Juan, Puerto Rico
Competitors at the 1974 Central American and Caribbean Games
Central American and Caribbean Games silver medalists for Puerto Rico
Central American and Caribbean Games medalists in tennis
Tennis players at the 1975 Pan American Games
Pan American Games medalists in tennis
Pan American Games silver medalists for Puerto Rico
Pan American Games bronze medalists for Puerto Rico
Michigan Wolverines men's tennis players
Medalists at the 1975 Pan American Games